William Gillis (10 November 1859 – 18 September 1929) was a British Labour politician who served as an MP between 1918 and 1922.

Born on a ship in the Black Sea, Gillis grew up in Gressenhall in Norfolk.  He moved to the West Riding of Yorkshire and became active in the Yorkshire Miners' Association (YMA) and the Labour Party.  He was elected to Hoyland Nether Urban District Council and served for a time as its chairman.  He stood in the 1921 Penistone by-election, gaining the seat for Labour, but was defeated at the 1922 general election, and did not stand again.  Following his stint in Parliament, he worked for the YMA and became a magistrate.

References

1859 births
1929 deaths
British trade unionists
Councillors in South Yorkshire
Labour Party (UK) MPs for English constituencies
People from Gressenhall
Politics of Penistone
UK MPs 1918–1922